Looney Tunes Super Stars' Tweety & Sylvester: Feline Fwenzy  is a DVD of 15 Sylvester and Tweety cartoons that was released on November 30, 2010. Unlike the previous Super Stars discs, this disc features 15 cartoons that were previously on the Golden Collection sets as the new plan for the Super Stars volumes is one with new-to-DVD cartoons and one with previously-on-DVD cartoons. The reason for the double-dip release in each wave is so the Warner Home Video department can pay back for the remastering of other restorations. Also, unlike the previous Super Stars discs, the cartoons are presented in original full screen.

Contents 
 All cartoons on this disc star Sylvester and Tweety, and are directed by Friz Freleng.

Controversy 
 Because the DVD contained only previously-released shorts from the Golden Collections, collectors were advised to stay away from this set. 

 While the USA version of this DVD set releases "Bad Ol' Putty Tat" and "Snow Business" restored, for reasons unknown, the European version of this DVD set for some reason releases "Bad Ol' Putty Tat" presented as a 1998 dubbed version (albeit without the dubbed notice) and "Snow Business" presented unrestored as the Stars of Space Jam VHS transfer with the altered 1959-1960 Merrie Melodies ending card on the European DVD release.

References 

Looney Tunes home video releases